The American Soccer League has been a name used by four different professional soccer sports league in the United States.  In 1988, the third American Soccer League was created as an East Coast counterpart to the West Coast-based Western Soccer Alliance.  The third iteration of the ASL lasted only two seasons, merging with the WSA in 1990 to form the American Professional Soccer League.

History
The league comprised ten teams on the East Coast. During its second season, the league champion Fort Lauderdale Strikers played the San Diego Nomads, champions of the Western Soccer Alliance in the 1989 National Pro Soccer Championship. By 1990, the ASL and WSA had merged to form the American Professional Soccer League.

Complete team list

Champions

References

External links
 Historical overview of the Soccer Wars
 Year by year standings

 
Defunct soccer leagues in the United States
Former summer association football leagues